The 14th Gaudí Awards, organised by the Catalan Film Academy, will be presented at the MNAC's Oval Room in Barcelona on 6 March 2022.

History 
The nominations were read by Francesc Orella and María Molins at La Pedrera's auditorium on 25 January 2022. Outlaws grossed the highest number of nominations, 13. Only one film (Mironins) was nominated in the animation category, thus securing the award. Enric Cambray was tasked with the direction of the gala, whereas  was charged with the production.

In addition to the regular awards, 8 films were nominated to the Public's Choice Special Award for Best Film, and cinematographer  was revealed as the recipient of the honorary Gaudí award.

Winners and nominees 

The winners and nominees are listed as follows:

Public's Choice Special Award 
 Mediterraneo: The Law of the Sea
 The Belly of the Sea
 The Odd-Job Men
 Tros
 Visitor
 Outlaws
 Libertad
 Out of Sync

Honorary Award 
Cinematographer  was selected as the recipient of the Gaudí honorary award.

References 

Gaudí Awards
2022 in Catalonia
G
21st century in Barcelona
March 2022 events in Spain